The Well is a 1991 Bulgarian drama film directed by Docho Bodzhakov. The film was selected as the Bulgarian entry for the Best Foreign Language Film at the 64th Academy Awards, but was not accepted as a nominee.

Cast
 Lyuben Chatalov as Bashtata
 Vania Tzvetkova as Uchitelkata / Dariya
 Petar Popyordanov as Sinat
 Boyan Kovachev as Sinat kato malak
 Daniela Vasileva as Dariya kato malka

See also
 List of submissions to the 64th Academy Awards for Best Foreign Language Film
 List of Bulgarian submissions for the Academy Award for Best Foreign Language Film

References

External links
 

1991 films
1991 drama films
Bulgarian drama films
Bulgarian-language films